Silver Creek Entertainment is a U.S.-based game developer of classic card games. It was established in 1994. The company released games for Xbox Live Arcade, Windows and Mac OS X:

 Hardwood Solitaire III (PC, Mac)
 Ruckus Bucks's Dangerous Mines (Xbox, PC, Mac)
 Hardwood Solitaire IV (iOS, Android, Nook, Kindle, PC, Mac, AppleTV)
 Hardwood Backgammon (Xbox 360, iOS, Android, Nook, Kindle, PC, Mac, AppleTV)
 Hardwood Hearts (Xbox 360, iOS, Android, Nook, Kindle, PC, Mac, AppleTV)
 Hardwood Spades (Xbox 360, iOS, Android, Nook, Kindle, PC, Mac, AppleTV)
 Hardwood Euchre (iOS, Android, Nook, Kindle, PC, Mac, AppleTV)
 Video Poker Duel (iOS, Android, Nook, Kindle, PC, Mac, AppleTV)
 Soltrio Solitaire (Xbox 360)
 InstaSpades (Web Game)
 Insta Hearts (Web Game)
 Insta Solitaire IV (Web Game)

External links 
 
 Official Instagames website
 IGN profile
 Google Play Profile
 iTunes Profile
 Silver Creek Entertainment profile from MobyGames
 Amazon App profile

Video game companies of the United States
Video game companies established in 1994
1994 establishments in the United States